Bandula Jagath was a Sri Lankan cricketer. He was a left-handed batsman and a left-arm medium-pace bowler who played for Moors Sports Club.

Jagath made a single first-class appearance for the side, during the 1995–96 season, against Nondescripts. From the tail end, he scored 15 in the first innings in which he batted, and 0 not out in the second, as his team lost the match by an innings margin, thanks to first-class bests from Russel Arnold and Carman Mapatuna.

References

External links
Bandula Jagath at Cricket Archive 

Sri Lankan cricketers
Moors Sports Club cricketers
Living people
Place of birth missing (living people)
Year of birth missing (living people)